Mekedatu is a location along Kaveri in the border of Chamarajanagar and Ramanagara Districts. From this point, about 3.5 kilometers downstream, the river Kaveri flows through a deep and narrow gorge. Mekedatu' means 'goat's leap' in Kannada.  The name comes from an event which is believed to have been witnessed by herdsmen in that area a long time ago. It is said that a goat being chased by a tiger made a desperate attempt to save its life by leaping from one side of the gorge and managed to cross over the raging river below, whereas the tiger did not attempt to replicate this feat, and abandoned the chase. The point where the goat leapt has widened since then from erosion caused by the river Cauvery. It is about 110 km from Bengaluru via Kanakapura.

There is also some mythological significance to this place (both Sangama and Mekedatu). In one version, the goat (meke) that is believed to have leapt across the Kaveri was Lord Shiva in disguise. On both rocky precipices of the gorge, one can find strange holes, whose shapes resemble goats' hooves, though several times larger. It is believed that only divine goats could have marked their 'footprints' in such hard rocks.

At Mekedaatu, the Kaveri runs through a deep, narrow ravine of hard granite rock.
The river, which is more than 150 meters wide at the confluence (at Sangama) flows through the hardly 10-meter-wide gorge at Mekedatu. It is said that a goat could leap over it, giving the falls the name Goat's Leap. Upstream on the Kaveri is the well known Shivanasamudra Falls with its hydro-electric power station, which was set up in 1902.

Gorge
The water flows very fast through the gorge, gouging pits in the rocky riverbed. The rocks are slippery making it difficult to climb down the gorge. It is dangerous to swim in the river due to the hard and slippery rocks. Despite warning signs indicating that it is dangerous to swim in the gorge many people attempt it. There have been numerous incidents of people drowning at this place.  Swimming/bathing or taking selfies standing on rocks in Cauvery river is also dangerous due to unseen rocks under water and whirlpools.

Directions

From Bangalore there are many tour operators who provide transport to Sangama.

From Kanakapura it is exactly 26 km. The drive to mekedatu takes you through the rustic interior villages of Karnataka making the drive a memorable one. On the way there are boards showing directions to Mekedaatu and Sangama. You will have to first drive to Sangama and then proceed to Mekedatu from there.

Once you reach Sangama you have to take a boat ride to reach the other side of the river. Then you can board a bus which keeps running every half an hour till 5 in the evening. 5.30 pm is the last bus from Mekedaatu to Sangama. After that no civilians are allowed in this place

Alternatively, you can walk to Mekedaatu after getting off from the boat. It is a good 5 to 6 km trek from there to reach Mekedaatu.

On the way to Mekedaatu there is fishing camp called Galibore Fishing Camp

So if you have missed the Mekedaatu board you can reach by seeing this fishing camp board as well because this is also on the way

Nearby
This place is en route to Mekedatu. Only a few people visit this place as most of them go by bus. In case people go on foot from Sangama, this place wouldn't be that hard to spot. Here water is not that powerful when compared to the actual place, thus making it much safer.

Chunchi Falls which is on Arkavati river is another nearby attraction in Kanakapura.

Notes

External links

47) Mekedatu 12km forest walk - Loaps
Map of Mekedatu
Mekedatu from Bangalore
One Day Trip to Mekedatu - A Detailed Itinerary from Bangalore

Waterfalls of Karnataka
Geography of Ramanagara district
Canyons and gorges of India